The 1961–62 Botola is the 6th season of the Moroccan Premier League. FAR Rabat are the holders of the title.

References

Morocco 1961–62

Botola seasons
Morocco
Botola